The INQ Chat 3G (occasionally dropping the '3G' to be called the INQ Chat) is a fully featured, 3G enabled "Candy Bar" smartphone created by the British manufacturer INQ, designed to easily interface with popular social media applications.   

Dubbed the 'Twitter phone', the INQ Chat 3G features integrated Twitter, Facebook, Skype and Windows Live Messenger applications. The phone sports a full QWERTY keypad, a 3.2-megapixel camera and a 2.4-inch screen.  The phone was launched alongside the INQ Mini 3G - both of which succeed the hugely successful INQ1.

History
The BREW device was announced on 4 August 2009, and developed in response to consumer demand for a full QWERTY keypad layout device from INQ. The phone debuted on 30 November 2009 in Italy, with a Sweden launch shortly after on 7 December 2009. The INQ Chat 3G had a simultaneous UK and Hong Kong launch, on 11 December, 2009. It was later released in Singapore on 22 December 2009, and in India on 16 March 2010. The mobile phone has also been released in Australia on 2 July and in Canada on 27 July.

Appearance
The phone features a red and black colour scheme, a full QWERTY keypad, a 2.4" QVGA TFT LCD screen, a mini-USB port, volume control buttons and a Switcher button (to switch between applications).

Artwork
INQ's packaging and instruction manual style is unique. The packaging the phone comes in is laden with artwork from various artists, and there is no manual as such, instead a set of 'Help Cards'. Each help card focusses on a particular part of the phone - for example Contacts, E-mail or Twitter - on one side, and then on the other side one of the many artworks selected by INQ. 
In their words: "We have collaborated with illustrators we love to turn our packaging and help cards into objects to cherish, not chuck." 

Along with this, all of the artworks are included as images on the phone and can set as the wallpaper or screensaver if desired. The artwork use on the Chat 3G's box is by Matt Huynh. 
The artwork for all of INQ's phones can be seen here, along with an introduction to "INQ+Art", brief descriptions of each artist, their artwork and which phone it was used for. 
(Note: some artists have had more than one of their pieces used, and on multiple phones).

Battery Covers
Like the Mini 3G, the INQ Chat 3G's battery covers are interchangeable with other colours. The default is the red battery cover, but black, pink and yellow battery covers can be purchased at participating stores of the default network in the respective countries. In Canada, phones bought on Telus receive, two battery covers, a solid color and an artwork cover - feature either the artwork by Paul Vizzari  or one of the pieces of artwork by Matt Huynh (different from the one use on the phone's box); both artworks feature on the back of the help cards.

On the reverse of all of the battery covers is a maze, and the Latin phrase "Audaces Fortuna Iuvat", meaning "fortune favours the brave", all leading to a mysterious secret embedded within the phone.

Features

Software

General
The user of the phone can display widgets on their home screen for quick and easy access to information.  Widgets include Facebook, Twitter, Weather and RSS.
Compatibility with doubleTwist.
Option to use the phone as a mobile modem, either over USB or DUN Bluetooth.

Applications
Applications include, but are not limited to:
Facebook
Twitter
Skype & Windows Live Messenger, which both make use of the free Skype and Messenger on selected Three networks
E-mail, including free Push GMail, as well as supporting the IMAP4, POP3 and SMTP e-mail protocols.
A media player, capable of playing Audio: AMR, AAC, AAC+, MIDI, MP3, WAV; Video: MPEG4, H.263, H.264
Google Maps for Mobile, making use of the built-in GPS
The NetFront browser, v3.5. In some countries, Opera Mini is the default browser instead.

Social Networking
The Chat 3G, as with all INQ phones, is built for social-networking, and it is highly integrated into the phone:
When the user take a picture they are immediately given the option to post to Twitter, using Twitpic, or to Facebook.
In the Contacts list, the user can assign social-networking profiles to a contact, including information about Facebook, Skype, Windows Live Messenger and e-mail. The contacts list then displays the Facebook or Windows Live Messenger profile picture, including the latest 'status update' from Facebook if the user is logged into the Facebook client. It also displays a small icon showing whether they are logged into Skype or Windows Live Messenger.

Hardware

Carriers
INQ is owned by Hutchison Whampoa, which own Hutchison 3G; because of this the phone is usually carried on the 3 network where possible. INQ have adopted a style whereby they launch their phones on one network in that country. There are exceptions (i.e. Australia & Canada), but these are where the networks are commercially linked.

The INQ Chat 3G is currently carried on the following networks:
 3 Denmark
 3 Hong Kong
 3 Ireland
 3 Italy
 3 Sweden
 3 United Kingdom
 Aircel
 SingTel
 Vodafone Australia and 3 Australia, both part of the Vodafone Hutchison Australia Group.
 Telus and Koodo Mobile (which is a subsidiary of Telus)

References

External links
INQ Mobile
Three UK
INQ Chat 3G on GSM Arena
INQ Chat 3G page on official INQ website
INQ Chat 3G page on Three UK website

INQ mobile phones